Sundene is a village and statistical area (grunnkrets) in Tjøme municipality, Norway.

The statistical area Sundene, which also can include the peripheral parts of the village as well as the surrounding countryside, has a population of 345.

The village Sundene is located on the northern end of the island, and does not belong to an urban settlement. A bridge connects it to Kjøpmannskjær in Nøtterøy municipality.

References

Villages in Vestfold og Telemark